Hutton Hang is a hamlet and civil parish in the Richmondshire district of North Yorkshire, England. The population taken at the 2011 census was less than 100. Information is included within the parish of Spennithorne. About 4 miles east of Leyburn. Nearby villages include Finghall, Akebar, Thornton Steward and Constable Burton.

References

Villages in North Yorkshire
Civil parishes in North Yorkshire